Corixidae is a family of aquatic insects in the order Hemiptera. They are found worldwide in virtually any freshwater habitat and a few species live in saline water. There are about 500 known species worldwide, in 55 genera, including the genus Sigara.

Members of the Corixidae are commonly known as water boatmen, a term that is sometimes used in the United Kingdom for Notonecta glauca, an insect of a different family, Notonectidae. Corixa punctata is the "lesser water boatman".

Morphology and ecology
Many have extremely fine dark brown or black striations marking the wings. They tend to have four long rear legs and two short front ones. The forelegs are covered with hairs and shaped like oars, hence the name "water boatman". Their four hindmost legs have scoop- or oar-shaped tarsi to aid swimming. They also have a triangular head with short, triangular mouthparts. Corixidae dwell in slow rivers and ponds, as well as some household pools.

Unlike their relatives the backswimmers (Notonectidae), who swim upside down, Corixidae swim right side up. It is easy to tell the two types of insects apart simply by looking at the swimming position.

Corixidae are unusual among the aquatic Hemiptera in that some species are non-predatory, feeding on aquatic plants and algae instead of insects and other small animals. They use their straw-like mouthparts to inject enzymes into plants. The enzymes digest the plant material, letting the insect suck the liquified food back through its mouthparts and into its digestive tract. However, most species are not strictly herbivorous and can even be completely predatory, like those of the subfamily Cymatiainae. In fact, Corixidae have a broad range of feeding styles: carnivorous, detritivorous, herbivorous and omnivorous.

Some species within this family are preyed upon by a number of amphibians including the rough-skinned newt (Taricha granulosa).

The reproductive cycle of Corixidae is annual. Eggs are typically oviposited (deposited) on submerged plants, sticks, or rocks. In substrate limited waters (waters without many submerged oviposition sites), every bit of available substrate will be covered in eggs.

Genera
These 52 genera belong to the family Corixidae:

 Acromocoris Bode, 1953 g
 Agraptocorixa Kirkaldy, 1898 g
 Archaecorixa Popov, 1968 g
 Arctocorisa Wallengren, 1894 i c g b
 Bakharia Popov, 1988 g
 Bumbacorixa Popov, 1986 g
 Callicorixa White, 1873 i c g b
 Cenocorixa Hungerford, 1948 i c g b
 Centrocorisa Lundblad, 1928 i c g
 Corisella Lundblad, 1928 i c g b
 Corixa Geoffroy, 1762 i c g
 Corixalia Popov, 1986 g
 Corixonecta Popov, 1986 g
 Corixopsis Hong & Wang, 1990 g
 Cristocorixa Popov, 1986 g
 Cymatia Flor, 1860 i c g b
 Dasycorixa Hungerford, 1948 i c g b
 Diacorixa Popov, 1971 g
 Diapherinus Popov, 1966 g
 Diaprepocoris c g
 Ectemnostegella Lundblad, 1928 g
 Gazimuria Popov, 1971 g
 Glaenocorisa Thomson, 1869 i c g b
 Graptocorixa Hungerford, 1930 i c g b
 Haenbea Popov, 1988 g
 Heliocorisa Lundblad, 1928 g
 Hesperocorixa Kirkaldy, 1908 i c g b
 Liassocorixa Popov, Dolling & Whalley, 1994 g
 Linicorixa Lin, 1980 g
 Lufengnacta Lin, 1977 g
 Mesocorixa Hong & Wang, 1990 g
 Mesosigara Popov, 1971 g
 Morphocorixa Jaczewski, 1931 i c g
 Neocorixa Hungerford, 1925 i c g
 Neosigara Lundblad, 1928 g
 Palmacorixa Abbott, 1912 i c g
 Palmocorixa b
 Paracorixa Stichel, 1955 g
 Parasigara Poisson, 1957 g
 Pseudocorixa Jaczewski, 1931 i c g
 Ramphocorixa Abbott, 1912 i c g b
 Ratiticorixa Lin, 1980 g
 Shelopuga Popov, 1988 g
 Siculicorixa Lin, 1980 g
 Sigara Fabricius, 1775 i c g b
 Sigaretta Popov, 1971 g
 Trichocorixa Kirkaldy, 1908 i c g b
 Velocorixa Popov, 1986 g
 Venacorixa Lin Qibin, 1986 g
 Vulcanicorixa Lin, 1980 g
 Xenocorixa Hungerford, 1947 g
 Yanliaocorixa Hong, 1983 g

Data sources: i = ITIS, c = Catalogue of Life, g = GBIF, b = Bugguide.net

References

External links 

 EverythingAbout.net
 Water Boatmen
 Buglopedia waterboatmen article
 water boatmen photos on the Tree of Life
 more water boatmen photos on Bug Guide

 
Nepomorpha
Heteroptera families